Nikola Jestratijević (born July 9, 1976) is a retired Serbian professional basketball player.

Playing career 
Jestratijević played for Crvena zvezda, FMP Železnik, Kinder Bologna, Budućnost, AEK Athens, ASVEL, Paris Racing, Spartak Primorye, and Śląsk Wrocław.

National team career 
In July 1996, Jestratijević was member of the Yugoslavian U-22 national team that won a bronze medal at the European Championship for Men 22 and Under in Sydney, Australia. In one tournament game, he recorded one rebound.

In September 2000, Jestratijević was member of the Yugoslavian national team at the 2000 Olympic Basketball Tournament in Sydney, Australia. Over four tournament games, he averaged 1.8 points and 1.2 rebounds per game.

Career achievements
 Euroleague champion: 1  (with Kinder Bologna: 2000–01)
 Italian League champion: 1  (with Kinder Bologna: 2000–01)
 Italian Cup winner: 1  (with Kinder Bologna: 2000–01)
 Yugoslav Cup winner: 1  (with FMP Železnik: 1996–97)

See also 
 List of KK Crvena zvezda players with 100 games played

References

External links
 Nikola Jestratijević at euroleague.com
 Nikola Jestratijević at eurobasket.com
 Nikola Jestratijevic at realgm.com

1976 births
Living people
ABA League players
AEK B.C. players
ASVEL Basket players
Basketball players from Belgrade
Basketball players at the 2000 Summer Olympics
BC Spartak Primorye players
Centers (basketball)
KK Budućnost players
KK Crvena zvezda players
KK FMP (1991–2011) players
Olympic basketball players of Yugoslavia
Paris Racing Basket players
People from Zemun
Serbian expatriate basketball people in Montenegro
Serbian expatriate basketball people in Italy
Serbian expatriate basketball people in France
Serbian expatriate basketball people in Russia
Serbian expatriate basketball people in Poland
Serbian expatriate basketball people in Greece
Serbian men's basketball players
Virtus Bologna players